As of Unicode version 15.0, Cyrillic script is encoded across several blocks:
 Cyrillic: U+0400–U+04FF, 256 characters
 Cyrillic Supplement: U+0500–U+052F, 48 characters
 Cyrillic Extended-A: U+2DE0–U+2DFF, 32 characters
 Cyrillic Extended-B: U+A640–U+A69F, 96 characters
 Cyrillic Extended-C: U+1C80–U+1C8F, 9 characters
 Cyrillic Extended-D: U+1E030–U+1E08F, 63 characters
 Phonetic Extensions: U+1D2B, U+1D78, 2 Cyrillic characters
 Combining Half Marks: U+FE2E–U+FE2F, 2 Cyrillic characters

The characters in the range U+0400–U+045F are basically the characters from ISO 8859-5 moved upward by 864 positions. The next characters in the Cyrillic block, range U+0460–U+0489, are historical letters, some of which are still used for Church Slavonic. The characters in the range U+048A–U+04FF and the complete Cyrillic Supplement block (U+0500-U+052F) are additional letters for various languages that are written with Cyrillic script.

Unicode includes few precomposed accented Cyrillic letters; the others can be combined by adding U+0301 ("combining acute accent") after the accented vowel (e.g., е́ у́ э́); see below.

The following two diacritical marks not specific to Cyrillic can be used with Cyrillic text:
  (= Cyrillic stress mark), in Combining Diacritical Marks block U+0300–U+036F. To input an accented letter with acute accent: for the letter R (for example), digit R0301 (without space between letter and number), then select  only and press  +  = Ŕ.
  (= Cyrillic ten thousands sign), in Combining Diacritical Marks for Symbols block U+20D0–U+20F0

In the table below, small letters are ordered according to their Unicode numbers; capital letters are placed immediately before the corresponding small letters. Standard Unicode names and canonical decompositions are included.

Table of characters

Blocks

The Cyrillic block (U+0400 – U+04FF) was added to the Unicode Standard in October, 1991 with the release of version 1.0:

The Cyrillic Supplement block (U+0500 – U+052F) was added to the Unicode Standard in March, 2002 with the release of version 3.2:

The Cyrillic Extended-A (U+2DE0 – U+2DFF) and Cyrillic Extended-B (U+A640 – U+A69F) blocks were added to the Unicode Standard in April, 2008 with the release of version 5.1:

The Cyrillic Extended-C block (U+1C80 – U+1C8F) was added to the Unicode Standard in June, 2016 with the release of version 9.0:

The Cyrillic Extended-D block (U+1E030 – U+1E08F) was added to the Unicode Standard in September, 2022 with the release of version 15.0:

See also
 List of Cyrillic letters
 Cyrillic script
 Cyrillic alphabets

References
 

Unicode

Russian-language computing
Internet in Russian language